Victor Alexandru Dumitru (born 28 October 1991, Buzau, Romania) is a Romanian rugby union footballer. His position on the field is scrum-half and currently plays for RC Timişoara. He was formed as a player at the LPS Focsani rugby club and was runner-up in Romania in the Junior National Rugby Championship during his period there.

External links
RC Timişoara

1991 births
Living people
Romanian rugby union players
Rugby union scrum-halves
SCM Rugby Timișoara players
Sportspeople from Timișoara
People from Buzău